The Georgetown University Law Center is the law school of Georgetown University, a private research university in Washington, D.C. It was established in 1870 and is the largest law school in the United States by enrollment and the most applied to, receiving more full-time applications than any other law school in the country.

A leading institution in constitutional, technology, and international law, numerous alumni have entered public service. The school's campus is several blocks from the U.S. Capitol Building, the center of the legislative branch of US government, and maintains a close association with the highest court in the US judicial branch, the nearby U.S. Supreme Court.   Georgetown is consistently ranked among the most prestigious law schools in the United States, occasionally shifting between 12th and 14th place, where it currently sits.

Prominent alumni include 91 members of the United States Congress, federal and state judges, billionaires, and diplomats. Georgetown is also ranked in the top 10 law schools for business and corporate law; international, criminal, environmental, health care, and tax law; as well as first in clinical training and part-time legal studies.

In the 2022 Academic Ranking of World Universities, Georgetown Law was ranked as the 13th best law school in the world.

History

Opened as Georgetown Law School in 1870, Georgetown Law was the second (after St. Louis University) law school run by a Jesuit institution within the United States. Georgetown Law has been separate from the main Georgetown campus (in the neighborhood of Georgetown) since 1890, when it moved near what is now Chinatown. The Law Center campus is located on New Jersey Avenue, several blocks north of the Capitol, and a few blocks west of Union Station. Georgetown Law School changed its name to Georgetown University Law Center in 1953. The school added the Edward Bennett Williams Law Library in 1989 and the Gewirz Student Center in 1993, providing on-campus living for the first time. The "Campus Completion Project" finished in 2004 with the addition of the Hotung International Building and the Sport and Fitness Center.

Georgetown Law's original wall (or sign) is preserved on the quad of the present-day campus.

Admissions
For the class entering in the fall of 2021, roughly 1,800 out of 14,052 J.D. applicants (12.9%) were offered admission, with 561 matriculating, marking the most competitive law school admission cycle and the largest applicant pool for any U.S. law school in history. The median LSAT score for the class entering in fall of 2021 is 171 and the median undergraduate GPA is 3.85. In the 2020–21 academic year, Georgetown Law had 2,021 J.D. students, of which 26% were minorities and 55% were female.

Employment

Of the 691 J.D. graduates in the Georgetown Law class of 2020 (including both full- and part-time students), 569 (82.3%) held long-term, full-time positions that required bar exam passage (i.e., jobs as lawyers) and were not school-funded nine months after graduation. 644 graduates overall (93.2%) were employed, 6 graduates (0.9%) were pursuing a graduate degree, and 34 graduates (4.9%) were unemployed.

435 J.D. graduates (63.0%) were employed in the private sector, with 368 (53.3%) at law firms with over 250 attorneys. 208 graduates (30.1%) entered the public sector, with 80 (11.6%) employed in public interest positions, 55 (8.0%) employed by the government, 68 (9.8%) in federal or state clerkships, and 5 (0.7%) in academic positions. 35 graduates (5.1%) received funding from Georgetown Law for their positions.

The median reported starting salary for a 2018 J.D. graduate in the private sector was $180,000. The median reported starting salary for a 2018 graduate in the public sector (including government, public interest, and clerkship positions) was $57,000.

272 J.D. graduates (39.4%) in the class of 2020 were employed in Washington, DC, 155 (22.4%) in New York, and 31 (4.5%) in California. 13 (1.9%) were employed outside the United States.

As of 2011, Georgetown Law alumni account for the second highest number of partners at NLJ 100 firms. It is among the top ten feeder schools in eight of the ten largest legal markets in the United States by law job openings (New York, Washington DC, Chicago, Los Angeles, Boston, Houston, San Francisco, and San Diego), again giving it the second-widest reach of all law schools. The school performs especially strongly in its home market, where it is the largest law school and has produced the greatest number of NLJ 100 partners.

Georgetown Law was ranked #11 for placing the highest percentage of 2018 J.D. graduates into associate positions at the 100 largest law firms.

Costs
The total cost of attendance (indicating the cost of tuition, fees, and living expenses) at Georgetown Law for the 2021–2022 academic year is $99,600. The Law School Transparency estimated debt-financed cost of attendance for three years is $352,279.

Campus

The Law Center is located in the Capitol Hill area of Washington, D.C. It is bounded by 2nd St. NW to the west, E St. NW to the south, 1st St. NW and New Jersey Avenue to the east, and Massachusetts Avenue to the north.

The campus consists of five buildings. Bernard P. McDonough Hall (1971, expanded in 1997) houses classrooms and Law Center offices and was designed by Edward Durell Stone. The Edward Bennett Williams Law Library building (1989) houses most of the school's library collection and is one of the largest law libraries in the United States. The Eric E. Hotung International Law Center (2004), named after Hong Kong businessman and philanthropist Eric Edward Hotung, includes two floors of library space housing the international collection, and also contains classrooms, offices, and meeting rooms. The Bernard S. and Sarah M. Gewirz Student Center (1993) provides apartment-style housing for 250–300 students as well as hosting offices for nine academic centers and institutes, the Law Center's Student Health clinic, the Center for Wellness Promotion, the Counseling and Psychiatric Service office, a dedicated prayer room for Muslim members of the Law Center community, a moot court room, a daycare (the Georgetown Law Early Learning Center), and a ballroom event space commonly used for academic conferences. The four-level Scott K. Ginsburg Sport & Fitness Center (2004) includes a pool, fitness facilities, and cafe, and connects the Hotung Building to the Gewirz Student Center.

Libraries

The Georgetown Law Library supports the research and educational endeavors of the students and faculty of the Georgetown University Law Center. It is the second largest law school in the United States, and as one of the premier research facilities for the study of law, the Law Library houses the nation's fourth largest law library collection and offers access to thousands of online publications. The Law Library was ranked by The National Jurist as the 14th best law library in the nation in 2010.

The mission of the library is to support fully the research and educational endeavors of the students and faculty of the Georgetown University Law Center, by collecting, organizing, preserving, and disseminating legal and law related information in any form, by providing effective service and instructional programs, and by utilizing electronic information systems to provide access to new information products and services.

The collection is split into two buildings. The Edward Bennett Williams Law Library (1989) is named after Washington, D.C. lawyer Edward Bennett Williams, an alumnus of the Law Center and founder of the prestigious litigation firm Williams & Connolly. It houses the Law Center's United States law collection, the Law Center Archives, and the National Equal Justice Library. The Williams library building consists of five floors of collection and study space and provides office space for most of the Law Center's law journals on the Law Library's first level.

The John Wolff International and Comparative Law Library (2004) is named after John Wolff, a long-serving member of the adjunct faculty and supporter of the Law Center's international law programs. The library is located on two floors inside the Eric E. Hotung building. It houses the international, foreign, and comparative law collections of the Georgetown University Law Center. Wolff Library collects primary and secondary law materials from Australia, Canada, France, Germany, Great Britain, Ireland, Mexico, New Zealand, Scotland, and South Africa. English translations of primary and secondary legal materials from other jurisdictions and compilations of foreign law on special topics are also included.

In addition to foreign law, the Wolff Library maintains an extensive collection of public and private international law, focusing on international trade, international environmental law, human rights, arbitration, tax and treaty law. The collection also includes documentation from many international organizations, including the International Court of Justice, the United Nations, the European Union, and the World Trade Organization.

Curriculum

Georgetown Law's J.D. program can be completed over three years of full-time day study or three to four years of part-time evening study. The school offers several LL.M. programs in specific areas, most notably tax law, as well as a general LL.M. curriculum for lawyers educated outside the United States. Georgetown launched a Master of Studies in Law (M.S.L.) degree program for professional journalists in the 2007–08 academic year. It also offers the highest doctoral degree in law (J.S.D.).

Students are offered the choice of two tracks for their first year of study. "Curriculum A" is a traditional law curriculum similar to that taught at most schools, including courses in civil procedure, constitutional law, contracts, criminal justice, property, torts, and legal research and writing. Four-fifths of the day students at Georgetown receive instruction under the standard program (sections 1, 2, 4, and 5).

"Curriculum B" is a more interdisciplinary, theoretical approach to legal study, covering an equal or wider scope of material but heavily influenced by the critical legal studies movement. The Curriculum B courses are Bargain, Exchange and Liability (contracts and torts), Democracy and Coercion (constitutional law and criminal procedure), Government Processes (administrative law), Legal Justice (jurisprudence), Legal Practice (legal research and writing), Legal Process and Society (civil procedure), and Property in Time (property). One-fifth of the full-time JD students receive instruction in the alternative Curriculum B program (Section 3).

Students in both curricula may participate in a week-long introduction to international law between the fall and spring semesters.

Clinics / programs 
Georgetown has long been nationally recognized for its leadership in the field of clinical legal education. In 2018, U.S. News ranked Georgetown #1 in the nation for Clinical Training, followed by New York University (2nd), CUNY (3rd), American University (4th), and Yale University (5th). Over 300 students typically participate in the program.

Georgetown's clinics are: Appellate Litigation Clinic, Center for Applied Legal Studies, The Community Justice Project, Criminal Defense & Prisoner Advocacy Clinic, Criminal Justice Clinic, D.C. Law Students in Court, D.C. Street Law Program, Domestic Violence Clinic, Federal Legislation and Administrative Clinic, Harrison Institute for Housing & Community Development Clinic, Harrison Institute for Public Law, Institute for Public Representation, International Women's Human Rights Clinic, and Juvenile Justice Clinic.

In the Winter 2017 edition of The National Jurist, Georgetown Law's Moot Court Program was ranked #4 in the country for 2015–16 and #5 among U.S. law schools that have had the best moot courts this past decade.

Appellate Litigation Clinic
Directed by Professor Erica Hashimoto (following 36 years of leadership by Professor Steven H. Goldblatt), the Appellate Litigation Clinic operates akin to a small appellate litigation firm. It has had four cases reach the United States Supreme Court on grants of writs of certiorari. One such case was Wright v. West, 505 U.S. 277 (1992), considered in habeas corpus the question whether the de novo review standard for mixed questions of law and fact established in 1953 (the Brown v. Allen standard) should be overruled. Another was Smith v. Barry, 502 U.S. 244 (1992), which reversed a Fourth Circuit determination that the court did not have jurisdiction over an appeal because the defendant's pro se brief could not serve as a timely notice of appeal.

Center for Applied Legal Studies
CALS represents refugees seeking political asylum in the United States because of threatened persecution in their home countries. Students in CALS assume primary responsibility for the representation of these refugees, whose requests for asylum have already been rejected by the U.S. government. The Center for Applied Legal Studies was founded in the 1980s by Philip Schrag. Until 1995, the Clinic heard cases in the field of consumer protection. Under the direction of Schrag and Andrew Schoenholtz, the Clinic began specializing in asylum claims, for both detained and non-detained applicants. In conjunction with their work for the Clinic, Schrag and Schoenholtz have written books about America's political asylum system, with the help of Clinic fellows and graduate students. The duo's most recent book, Lives in the Balance, was published in 2014 and provides an empirical analysis of how Homeland Security decided asylum cases over a recent fourteen-year period. The group's work in human rights law has met praise from international organizations like the United Nations Human Rights Council. Under the direction of Schrag and Schoenholtz, the clinic has also focused on more prolonged displacement situations for political refugees.

Civil Rights Clinic 
CRC operates as a public interest law firm, representing individual clients and other public interest organizations, primarily in the areas of discrimination and constitutional rights, workplace fairness, and open government. The Clinic is directed by Professor Aderson Francois, who joined in 2016.  Students work with CRC staff attorneys to litigate Freedom of Information Act claims, wage theft suits, and retaliation claims on behalf of employees terminated for asserting their rights under FLSA and DC Wage and Hour law.

Criminal Defense and Prisoner Advocacy Clinic
Students in CDPAC represent defendants facing misdemeanor charges in D.C. Superior Court, facing parole or supervised release revocation from the United States Parole Commission working with the Public Defender Service for the District of Columbia, and they also work on prisoner advocacy projects. Abbe Smith is the director of CDPAC. Former Public Defender Service for the District of Columbia lawyer Vida Johnson works with Smith in CDPAC and the Prettyman fellowship program.

DC Street Law Program
The DC Street Law Program, Directed by Professor Charisma X. Howell, provides legal education to the DC population through two projects: the Street Law High Schools Clinic and the Street Law Community Clinic. Professor Richard Roe directed the Street Law High Schools Clinic since 1983. Professor Howell became the director in 2018. In the program, students introduce local high school students to the basic structure of the legal system, including the relationship among legislatures, courts, and agencies, and how citizens, especially in their world, relate to the lawmaking processes of each branch of government.

Harrison Institute for Public Law
The Harrison Institute is one of the longest running public law clinics in the country, having begun as the Project for Community Legal Assistance in 1972. In 1980 it was renamed in honor of Anne Blaine Harrison, a philanthropist and early supporter of the institute. Over its history, the institute has been home to several clinical programs, including focuses on state and local legislation, administrative advocacy, housing and community development, and policy. In 2019, under the directorship of Robert Stumberg, the institute consists of four policy teams: Climate, Health, Human Rights, and Trade. Each of these teams involves students working to shape policy to achieve client goals.

List of deans

Faculty

Notable current faculty include:

 Charles F. Abernathy, Professor of civil rights and comparative law
 Lama Abu-Odeh, Palestinian-American scholar of Islamic law, family law, and feminism
 Randy Barnett, Libertarian constitutional law scholar, author of The Structure of Liberty and Restoring the Lost Constitution, 2008 Guggenheim Fellow
 M. Gregg Bloche, professor of public health policy
 Rosa Brooks, Professor of national security, military, and international law, columnist for Foreign Policy
 Paul Butler, Professor of criminal law and civil rights, expert on jury nullification
 Sheryll D. Cashin, Professor of civil rights and housing law
 Julie E. Cohen, Professor of copyright, intellectual property, and privacy law
 David D. Cole, Professor of first amendment and criminal procedure law
 Peter Edelman, former Assistant Secretary of Health and Human Services
 Doug Emhoff, Distinguished Visitor from Practice, Distinguished Fellow of Georgetown Law's Institute for Technology Law and Policy, Second Gentleman of the United States, lawyer
 Heidi Li Feldman, Professor of law
 Lawrence O. Gostin, Professor of public health law
 Shon Hopwood, Associate Professor, convicted bank robber turned jailhouse lawyer who represented matters before the Supreme Court
 Neal Katyal, Former Acting Solicitor General of the United States, Professor of national security law
 Marty Lederman, Associate Professor, Deputy Assistant Attorney General at the Department of Justice Office of Legal Counsel
 Naomi Mezey, Professor of law and culture
 Eleanor Holmes Norton, Delegate representing Washington, DC in the U.S. House of Representatives
 Victoria F. Nourse, Chief Counsel to Vice President Joe Biden and principal author of the Violence Against Women Act
 Ladislas Orsy, canonical theologian
 Gary Peller, Prominent member of critical legal studies and critical race theory movements
 Nicholas Quinn Rosenkranz, former attorney-advisor at the Office of Legal Counsel in the U.S. Department of Justice
 Louis Michael Seidman, Carmack Waterhouse Professor of Constitutional Law, significant proponent of the critical legal studies movement
 Howard Shelanski, Former Administrator of the Office of Information and Regulatory Affairs
 Abbe Smith, Criminal Defense Attorney and Director of the Criminal Defense & Prisoner Advocacy Clinic
 Daniel K. Tarullo, Member of the Board of Governors of the Federal Reserve System
 William M. Treanor, Dean of Georgetown University Law Center, former dean of Fordham University School of Law, noted constitutional law expert
 Rebecca Tushnet, Professor of copyright, trademark, intellectual property, and first amendment law, noted for her scholarship on fanfiction
 David Vladeck, Former Director of the Bureau of Consumer Protection at the Federal Trade Commission
 Robin West, Frederick J. Haas Professor of Law and Philosophy, proponent of feminist legal theory and the law and literature movement

Publications

Georgetown University Law Center publishes fourteen student-run law journals, two peer-reviewed law journals, and a weekly student-run newspaper, the Georgetown Law Weekly. The journals are:

 American Criminal Law Review
 Food and Drug Law Journal
 Georgetown Environmental Law Review
 Georgetown Immigration Law Journal
 Georgetown Journal of Gender and the Law
 Georgetown Journal of International Law
 Georgetown Journal of Law and Modern Critical Race Perspectives
 Georgetown Journal of Law and Public Policy
 Georgetown Journal of Legal Ethics
 Georgetown Journal on Poverty Law and Policy
 Journal of National Security Law and Policy
 Georgetown Law Technology Review (online only)
 Georgetown Law Journal
In 2021, ranked by Google Scholar and Washington and Lee School of Law as the #4 and #5 most influential law review in the country, respectively.
In 2021, ranked #8 in the nation based on the Meta Ranking of Flagship US Law Reviews at U.S. law schools by Assistant Professor Bryce Clayton Newell.

Controversies 
In January 2022, Ilya Shapiro, the incoming executive director and senior lecturer of the Georgetown Center for the Constitution, wrote in a tweet that he opposed President Biden's intent to nominate a black woman to the Supreme Court, writing that because Biden would not nominate Shapiro's friend Sri Srinivasan, he was choosing a "lesser black woman."  The dean of Georgetown University Law Center condemned the remarks, stating, "The tweets’ suggestion that the best Supreme Court nominee could not be a Black woman and their use of demeaning language are appalling...The tweets are at odds with everything we stand for at Georgetown Law."  Shapiro later deleted the tweet as well as many other tweets he had written in the past, and issued a statement calling it an, "inartful tweet." Shapiro was then placed on administrative leave while being investigated for violations of "professional conduct, non-discrimination, and anti-harassment" rules. As a result of the investigation, Shapiro was reinstated, as the school's investigators found that he was "not properly subject to discipline." Nevertheless, on June 6 Shapiro chose to resign in protest, arguing that the school had "implicitly repealed Georgetown’s vaunted Speech and Expression Policy and set me up for discipline the next time I transgress progressive orthodoxy."

Notable alumni

Notes

References

Citations

Sources

External links

 
 INSPIRE records, at the University of Maryland libraries. The Institute of Public Interest Representation (INSPIRE) is part of the Georgetown University Law Center.

 
Environmental law schools
Edward Durell Stone buildings
Law schools in Washington, D.C.
Educational institutions established in 1870
1870 establishments in Washington, D.C.
Catholic law schools in the United States